Belur Keshavamurthy Ravi (born 17 November 1965) is an Indian cricket umpire. He has stood in games in the 2015–16 Ranji Trophy.

References

1965 births
Living people
Indian cricket umpires
Cricketers from Bangalore